Varanavasi is a village in the Ariyalur taluk of Ariyalur district, Tamil Nadu, India.

Demographics 
 census, Varanavasi had a total population of 4,051 with 1,989 males and 2,062 females.

References 

Villages in Ariyalur district